is a Japanese fashion model who is represented by the talent agency, Azur.

Biography
Haruka debuted in 1995 during college. During her university, she is majoring in child education and becoming a kindergarten teacher and elementary school teacher, to get that license.

After her debut, Haruka was appointed to appear in advertisements for Suntory and Kanebo Cosmetics. After agreeing with Kanebo Cosemetics she later appeared for another brand called Towani.

In 1998, Haruka signed a contract for the magazine Classy, and appeared on the magazine Domani from 2005 to 2007, and in 2008 she worked as a model and appeared in the cover for Grace. She obtained overwhelming support from women in the same generation.

In 2007, Haruka collaborated with mail order company Dinos for a brand called Cara by Haruka, and also become a fashion designer by announcing her wedding dress brand, Biancarosa by Haruka.

In March 2008, she married writer Keiichiro Hirano.

In November 29, 2011, Haruka gave birth to her first child. She later gave birth to another child in August 2013.

Filmography

TV series

Magazines

Advertisements

References

External links
  

Japanese female models
1975 births
Living people
Models from Aichi Prefecture